was a Japanese writer. His   stories were adapted into a series of films by Toho in the 1950s.

He was born in Shitara, Aichi.

See also
Japanese literature
List of Japanese authors

References

External links 
 

1896 births
1934 deaths
Japanese writers
Writers from Aichi Prefecture